Harry Bannister (September 29, 1889 – February 26, 1961) was an American stage, film and television actor, and theater producer and director.

Biography 
Born in Holland, Michigan, Bannister began acting in movies and on Broadway in the 1920s. He married the actress Ann Harding in 1926, and appeared with her in two films, Her Private Affair (1929) and The Girl of the Golden West (1930). The two of them also were prominent actors in Pittsburgh theatre, appearing in productions with the Sharp Company and later starting the Nixon Players.  They were divorced in 1932.

Bannister founded the American Music Hall Theatre Group in New York City. Its first production, a melodrama entitled The Drunkard, ran for 277 performances. He appeared regularly on Broadway in the 1950s, starring, opposite Celeste Holm, in Affairs of State and in Love Me Long with Shirley Booth.

On television Bannister played one of the fathers in the 1953 Russel Crouse TV series Life with Father.

He died in Manhattan, New York City, at the age of 71.

Filmography

Sources

The New York Times, February 27, 1961: "Harry Bannister Is Dead at 72"

References

External links

1889 births
1961 deaths
American male film actors
American male stage actors
American male television actors
American theatre managers and producers
American theatre directors
20th-century American male actors